Leucomastus is a genus of gastropods belonging to the family Enidae.

The species of this genus are found near Black Sea.

Species:

Leucomastus dardanus 
Leucomastus eburnea 
Leucomastus kindermanni 
Leucomastus varnensis

References

Enidae